The following is a list of notable harmonium players.

Harmonium players

Aditya Oke
Alistair Iain Paterson
Amjad Sabri
Arwind Thatte
Bhupen Hazarika
Farrukh Fateh Ali Khan
Fanna-Fi-Allah
George Harrison
Georges Lamothe
George Martin
Govindrao Patwardhan
G. Ramanathan
Ivor Cutler
Kedar Naphade
Krishna Das
Larry Knechtel
Lisa Alvarado
Jai Uttal
Robert ÆOLUS Myers
Govindrao Tembe
Husnlal Bhagatram
Maqbool Ahmed Sabri
Mehmood Dhaulpuri
M. S. Baburaj
Nico
Nóirín Ní Riain
Nusrat Fateh Ali Khan
Olivia Chaney
Omkar Agnihotri
Patrayani Seetharama Sastry
Prakash Hegde Yadalli
Raju Ananthaswamy
Richard Tandy
Rijram Desad
R. K. Bijapure
Sabri Brothers
Santosh Ghante
Satyajit Prabhu
Shankar–Jaikishan
Shapla Salique
Shilpa Ray
Sudhir Nayak
Tori Amos
Tulsidas Borkar
Tymon Dogg
Ustad Qasim
Vidyadhar Oke
Witthüser & Westrupp
Wynne Paris

See also

Lists of musicians

References

Harmonium
Harmonium players